David Scanlon (born 7 August 1984) is an Irish cricketer. He made his List A debut for North West Warriors in the 2017 Inter-Provincial Cup on 29 May 2017. He made his first-class debut for North West Warriors in the 2017 Inter-Provincial Championship on 30 May 2017. He made his Twenty20 debut for North West Warriors in the 2017 Inter-Provincial Trophy on 23 June 2017.

He was the leading wicket-taker in the 2018 Inter-Provincial Championship, with nineteen dismissals in four matches.

References

External links
 

1984 births
Living people
Irish cricketers
North West Warriors cricketers
Sportspeople from Derry (city)